Collema (jelly lichen) is a genus of lichens in the family Collemataceae. The photobiont is the cyanobacterium genus Nostoc.

Species

Collema actinoptychum 
Collema coniophilum  – Canada
Collema flaccidum 
Collema furfuraceum 
Collema glaucophthalmum 
Collema glebulentum 
Collema implicatum 
Collema insulare 
Collema japonicum 
Collema laeve 
Collema leptaleum 
Collema leucocarpum 
Collema marginale 
Collema nigrescens 
Collema pulcellum 
Collema pustulatum 
Collema rugosum 
Collema ryssoleum 
Collema sichuanense  – China
Collema subconveniens 
Collema subflaccidum 
Collema subnigrescens 
Collema substipitatum

References

Peltigerales
Lichen genera
Peltigerales genera
Taxa described in 1780